The Mary Church Terrell House is a historic house at 326 T Street NW in Washington, D.C.  It was a home of civil rights leader Mary Church Terrell (1863-1954), the first black woman to serve on an American school board, and a leading force in the desegregation of public accommodations in the nation's capital.  Her home in the LeDroit Park section of Washington, DC was declared a National Historic Landmark in 1975.  The building is a contributing property in the LeDroit Park Historic District.

Description
The Mary Church Terrell House stands in Washington's LeDroit Park neighborhood, southeast of Howard University, on the south side of T Street between 3rd and 4th Streets.  It is a 2-1/2 story brick half-house, set on a nearly full-height raised basement.  The front facade has a single bay, consisting of a polygonal window bay at the basement and first level, and a large segmented-arch window on the second floor.  A smaller window is located in the half-gable above, with half of a round window set in a bed of Victorian shingles at the peak.  The main entrance is via a porch on the left side; the right side of the building is a plain brick party wall for a non-existent right side.

History
Mary Church Terrell was born in Tennessee and educated at Oberlin College.  She became a school teacher in Washington 1887, and married Robert Terrell, a prominent African-American attorney, in 1891.  She stopped working at that time, but remained engaged in efforts to improve the district's schools.  In 1895 she was appointed to the district's school board, the first African-American woman in the nation to sit on such a board.  She served two terms, seeking to improve the quality of the district schools.  She was a founder and first president of the National Association of Colored Women, and supported broad-based efforts at achieving women's suffrage.  In the 1950s she was involved in efforts to challenge the district's lack of enforcement of public accommodation laws originally passed in the 1870s, participating in actions resulting in the favorable District of Columbia v. John R. Thompson Co. decision.

Restoration
Since the house has been unoccupied for a number of years, the condition was degrading and apparent to even a casual observer. In the summer of 2008 a restoration was started primarily supported in by a grant from the National Park Service Save America's Treasures program. Additional support came from Howard University, the US Department of Housing and Urban Development, the DC Office of Planning and the National Trust for Historic Preservation.

Based on outside observation, it appears the brick work was repaired and re-pointing, major structural problems on outside porches, windows support and trim were fixed, the roof was repaired and the windows were covered properly using plywood. Since this was finished in the Summer of 2009, no more work appears to have been done.

Additional information

A call to the National Park Service in November, 2019 confirmed that the home is privately owned and not open to the public.

See also
Fort Brown
List of National Historic Landmarks in Washington, D.C.
National Register of Historic Places listings in the upper NW Quadrant of Washington, D.C.

References

External links

 Dignity and Defiance: A Portrait of Mary Church Terrell. (documentary film)
Mary Church Terrell House, NRHP 'travel itinerary' listing at the National Park Service

National Historic Landmarks in Washington, D.C.
Historic American Buildings Survey in Washington, D.C.
Victorian architecture in Washington, D.C.
African-American history of Washington, D.C.
Women in Washington, D.C.